Dov Shmotkin (born 1949) is Professor Emeritus in the School of Psychological Sciences and Head of the Herczeg Institute on Aging at Tel Aviv University.

Biography 
Dov Shmotkin was born in 1949 in Rishon Le-Zion, Israel. He is Professor Emeritus in the School of Psychological Sciences and Head of the Herczeg Institute on Aging, both at Tel Aviv University, where he also received his Ph.D. He is a senior clinical psychologist and was formerly the head of the clinical psychology graduate program in the School of Psychological Sciences. Shmotkin was Visiting Scholar in the Institute of Gerontology at the University of Michigan, Ann Arbor (1988–89), and Honorary Fellow in the Institute on Aging at the University of Wisconsin, Madison (1996–97), USA. He has served as a senior researcher and member in the research teams of prominent nationwide surveys on the Israeli older population, namely the Cross-Sectional and Longitudinal Aging Study (CALAS) and the Israeli branch of the Survey of Health, Ageing and Retirement in Europe (SHARE-Israel). He also directed a project that harmonized databases of CALAS, SHARE-Israel, and other studies of Israeli aging populations. Dov Shmotkin  is a Fellow of the Gerontological Society of America.

Research 

Dov Shmotkin's scientific work has solidified the dialectical approach to human happiness and suffering, emphasizing developmental paths along adulthood and old age.
His main concern has been to explore psychological mechanisms whereby people can maintain well-being and resilience in the face of life adversities and aging processes that may inflict trauma, decline and loss. 
In his conceptual model, entitled The Pursuit of Happiness in a Hostile World, Shmotkin, along with associates who made vital contributions (mainly his former doctoral students), have developed a dynamic view on the intertwinement of resilience and vulnerability. 
The conceptual and empirical work of Shmotkin in the domains of gerontology sought to elucidate how wellness, adaptational functioning and self-fulfillment might counter frailty, disability and disintegration in later life.  
The emerging theme that unifies these scientific works is Shmotkin's humanistic quest for more refined and differential views over the interfaces of well-being and distress in human lives.

The Pursuit of Happiness in a Hostile World 

It is widely held that happiness is achieved through two major systems: subjective well-being (people's evaluations of the satisfaction and pleasantness in their lives) and meaning in life (people's conceptions that they lead a life corresponding to their values and potentials).
While most approaches regard happiness as a mental outcome, Shmotkin's model considers it a process. Accordingly, both subjective well-being and meaning in life systems regulate, or otherwise reconstruct, personal conceptions of hostile-world scenarios. The concept of hostile-world scenario is central for depicting the image that each individual has about actual or potential threats to one's life or, more broadly, to one's physical and mental integrity. The hostile-world scenario dwells on self-beliefs about catastrophes and inflictions such as accidents, violence, natural disasters, wars, illness, breakup of close relationships, losses of beloved ones, aging, and death. For most people, the hostile-world scenario is an adaptive mechanism for scanning potentially adverse conditions in life. Yet, when under-activated, it may induce a fool's paradise with reckless behaviors and, when over-activated, it may produce a horrible sense of living in a disastrous world.

The ever-active negotiations between the happiness-promoting systems and the hostile-world scenario constitute the dynamic core of the model. The pursuit of happiness, rather than happiness itself, provides individuals with a favorable psychological environment that allows them to function competently despite the imminence of hostile-world scenarios. The study of these dynamics exposes various mechanisms of resilience whereby the happiness-promoting systems, in threatening conditions, may amplify each other or possibly compensate for each other. Non-resilient mechanisms are also possible when hostile-world scenarios involve increased depletion and vulnerability. Mechanisms of these kinds, along with related tenets of Shmotkin's model, have been accumulatively illuminated by a body of empirical findings derived from diverse populations.
Besides empirical works that have been published, the model has been evoking an array of validation endeavors that currently expand the underlying conceptualization and still await publication.

The Multiple Appearances of Happiness 

In line with its dynamic features, Shmotkin's work explicated multiple modules and configurations of happiness. For example, different synchronic combinations between dimensions of subjective well-being (e.g., life satisfaction, positive affect) produced differential types of well-being among individuals. 
Notably, some of these types were internally inconsistent (e.g., people that were high on life satisfaction but low on positive affect). Also important were diachronic combinations where subjective well-being was queried in relation to different time zones (past, present, future), thus depicting varying temporal trajectories that conveyed different narratives about how one's well-being evolved along the individual's life course.
Shmotkin also investigated how people conceived their well-being in relation to their past life, as reflected in the concept of anchor periods, referring to paramount experiences in one's remembered past (e.g., “the happiest period in my life,” “the most miserable period in my life”). The studies showed that people formed an emotional matrix of happiness and suffering in past periods of their lives. This matrix reflected both consistent and inconsistent feelings, which were found associated with current subjective well-being, reactions to trauma, and coping with aging.
These varied modules, both within one's subjective well-being and in combination with meaning in life, constitute diverse options of coping with adversities in life.

Through his emphasis on multiple appearances of happiness, Shmotkin advocated the use of person-centered, rather than variable-centered, methods in order to delineate unattended configurations of human functioning
and well-being. Thus, the use of this approach contrasted types of individuals that maintained congruity in their relative standing on related variables (e.g., subjective well-being and meaning in life) and types that were incongruent in this regard. Such incongruent types may indicate conflicting or ambivalent inclinations within individuals, but may also encompass adaptational advantages. This notion is in line with Shmotkin's dialectical view that resilience and vulnerability, mainly in disadvantageous and distressful conditions, co-reside within the same individuals.

The Endurance of Holocaust Survivors and the Long-Term Effects of Trauma in Life 

In Shmotkin's studies, Holocaust survivors present a paradigm of extreme trauma happening early in life with sequelae lingering up to their old age. In his approach, the trauma is a test case for the functionality of the happiness-promoting systems in tackling the intensified hostile-world scenario and suggesting a world of normalcy. By studying Holocaust survivors in an array of community and national samples,
Shmotkin and his colleagues highlighted a consistent conclusion that older survivors usually manifested general resilience in most life domains along with specific vulnerabilities in pertinent psychosocial issues. Coping with the trauma was modulated by properties of the survivors’ time perspective on their period of traumatization
and their ability to incorporate the trauma into a coherent life story. In reviews of research on Holocaust survivors, Shmotkin explicated how long-term effects of the survivors’ trauma interacted with aging processes and family constellation.

As part of the attempts to advance methodological approaches that facilitated new revelations, an intricate consideration in Shmotkin's studies on Holocaust survivors was the choice of focal and comparison groups. The question “Who is a survivor?” proved uneasy, and was approached by combining both subjective and factual criteria. It was also expounded that the habitual use of merely one comparison group in past studies on survivors was not methodologically suitable, and several different groups were actually required for allowing instructive comparability with the survivors’ grouping.

At another level, Shmotkin examined long-term traumatic effects by national data from the Israeli branch of Survey of Health, Ageing and Retirement in Europe (SHARE-Israel). Shmotkin and his collaborators delineated the notion of cumulative adversity, which typically characterized stressful experiences along biographical courses of older people, and further differentiated between self-oriented (primary harm was to the self) and other-oriented (primary harm was to another person) foci of potentially traumatic events.
The investigatory team found that cumulative adversity, particularly of the self-oriented kind, was detrimental in various domains of physical and mental functioning.

Gerontological Investigations: Exploring the Underpinnings of Aging 

Shmotkin's dialectical view extends into his gerontological work, where aging and old age constantly reflect opposite, yet interactive, vectors of resilience versus vulnerability and survival versus finitude. His work largely dwells on epidemiological national surveys (mainly CALAS and SHARE-Israel; see above), where he often juxtaposed concomitants of physical health and mental health. Thus, while physical factors were found increasingly dominant in predicting people's mortality in old age,
certain psychosocial factors retained their distinctive predictive effect.

Another main concern in Shmotkin's gerontological work has been the role of individuals’ time perspective in understanding later life's phenomena.
At old age, in an apparent paradoxical fashion, people usually preserve relatively high levels of happiness, even following harsh adversity in the past and in the face of a foreshortened future. Besides this inclination, Shmotkin's studies showed modes whereby older people sorted out positive and negative feelings from their past and buffered fears about their future. In these inquiries, notions of time perspective appeared fully embedded in the adjustment of people to their old age.
In other directions, Shmotkin was also attracted to study aging-related issues that bore intriguing, yet scarcely examined, implications. Such issues included the continuity of adult children's bonds with their deceased parents,
the inconsistency between objective and subjective indicators of one's memory in old age,
the loosening relations between physical dysfunction and mental wellness in very old age, the agonizing affliction of bereavement over the loss of a child among aged parents,
and the challenges of fatherhood and aging among gay versus heterosexual men.

References

External links 

 Aging in a Hostile World: A conference for the presentation of a current study on aging (July 2017). (in French)
 "Beyond Good and Bad": On the Work of Prof. Dov Shmotkin. Published in The World Book of Happiness: The Knowledge and Wisdom of One Hundred Happiness Professors. Author and Editor-in-Chief: Leo Bormans. Singapore: Page One Publishing, 2010.
 "Re-evaluating the Time of Your Life": An interview with Prof. Dov Shmotkin about his study (originally published by the American Friends of Tel Aviv University, October 2010).

1949 births
Living people
Academic staff of Tel Aviv University
Israeli psychologists